Lectionary 1446/350 is a 10th-century Parchment fragment. It is currently in the National Archives of Georgia where it is described as "fond #1446, manuscript #350) 2 pp. parchment; fragment; dimensions: 233x180; Asomtavruli; ink – brown; title and initials – with cinnabar; written in two columns; ruling lines are discernible."

This fragment, reflecting the oldest Jerusalem liturgical tradition, is a valuable asset to fill in gaps in the overall picture of the entire cultural heritage. Due to the establishment of the Constantinopolitan liturgical tradition, the Jerusalem lectionary was withdrawn from the service and was left in oblivion, so that its Greek version is not preserved. Lectionaries in Georgian, Armenian and Albanian, on the one hand, provide a perfect possibility to get some idea of the liturgical practice of an early date and, on the other hand, to reconstruct older translations of the Old and New Testament pericopes, than were known to date from separate manuscripts or their fragments.

In 2015 Lectionary 1446/350 was inscribed to UNESCO Memory of the World Register.

Literature 
The UNESCO Memory of the World Register. The Manuscripts Preserved in the National Archives of Georgia. Editor/compiler Ketevan Asatiani. Tbilisi. 2016

Internet resources 

http://www.unesco.org/new/en/communication-and-information/memory-of-the-world/register/full-list-of-registered-heritage/registered-heritage-page-8/the-oldest-manuscripts-preserved-at-the-national-archives-of-georgia/

Georgian manuscripts